Jukka-Pekka Tuomanen (born 4 December 1985) is a Finnish football player currently playing for JJK.

External links
  Profile at veikkausliiga.com

References

Guardian Football

1985 births
Living people
Finnish footballers
Turun Palloseura footballers
FF Jaro players
JJK Jyväskylä players
Veikkausliiga players
Association football midfielders
People from Lohja
Sportspeople from Uusimaa